Renker is a surname. Notable people with the surname include:

 Gustav Renker (1889–1967), Austrian and Swiss journalist and writer
 Greg Renker (born 1957), American businessman

See also
 Guthy-Renker, a California-based direct-response marketing company